Jamides limes is a butterfly of the lycaenids or blues family. It is found on Borneo.

References

 (1895). A monograph of the Bornean Lycaenidae, Proceedings of the Zoological Society of London. 1895: 556-567, 4 pls.
 (1992). A generic classification of the tribe Polyommatini of the Oriental and Australian regions (Lepidoptera, Lycaenidae, Polyommatinae). Bulletin of the University of Osaka Prefecture, Series B, Vol. 44, Suppl.
 (1989). On some type specimens of Lycaenidae from South East Asia. Tyô to Ga 40(1): 23-80.

Butterflies described in 1895
Jamides
Butterflies of Borneo